Klamath Falls station is a train station in Klamath Falls, Oregon, served by Amtrak's Coast Starlight.   Located at 1600 Oak Avenue, the station building has a waiting room with a ticket agent. Klamath Falls is the southernmost station in Oregon. Via bus connections, it serves a large swath of southwestern Oregon, including Medford.

The Klamath Falls depot was built in 1916 for the Southern Pacific Railroad. It is composed of dark grey random ashlar walls with staggered light stone trim highlighting the windows and doors. A hipped roof with deep eaves supported by brackets protects passengers from inclement weather. Renovations that took place in 1999–2000 focused on the restrooms, ticket counter and entryways; new carpet and cabinets were also installed.

References

External links

Amtrak stations in Oregon
Railway stations in the United States opened in 1909
Transportation buildings and structures in Klamath County, Oregon
1909 establishments in Oregon
Former Southern Pacific Railroad stations in Oregon